Michael Bernard. Broderick, Jr. (born February 27, 1939) was a member of the South Dakota State Senate, representing district 16.

Broderick is from Canton, South Dakota. He was appointed to the South Dakota State House of Representatives in 1993 to fill the vacancy left by Michael O'Connor. Broderick remained in the state House of Representatives until 2002. He served in the South Dakota State Senate from 2005 until the 2006.

External links
Mike Broderick's record in the South Dakota State Legislature Historical Listing

1939 births
Living people
Members of the South Dakota House of Representatives
South Dakota state senators
People from Canton, South Dakota
People from Thurston County, Nebraska